The 2018–19 Anaheim Ducks season was the 26th season for the National Hockey League franchise that was established on June 15, 1993. The Ducks began the season on the road, defeating their division rival, the San Jose Sharks, who swept the Ducks in the First Round of the 2018 playoffs.

On February 10, 2019, the Ducks fired head coach Randy Carlyle. He was temporarily replaced by interim coach Bob Murray. On March 26, 2019, the Ducks failed to make the playoffs for the first time since 2011–12.

Standings

Schedule and results

Preseason
The preseason schedule was published on June 21, 2018.

Regular season
The regular season schedule was released on June 21, 2018.

Player statistics
As of April 5, 2019

Skaters

Goaltenders

†Denotes player spent time with another team before joining the Ducks. Stats reflect time with the Ducks only.
‡Denotes player was traded mid-season. Stats reflect time with the Ducks only.
Bold/italics denotes franchise record.

Transactions
The Ducks have been involved in the following transactions during the 2018–19 season.

Trades

Free agents

Waivers

Contract terminations

Retirement

Signings

Draft picks

Below are the Anaheim Ducks' selections at the 2018 NHL Entry Draft, which was held on June 22 and 23, 2018, at the American Airlines Center in Dallas, Texas.

Notes:
 The New Jersey Devils' third-round pick went to the Anaheim Ducks as the result of a trade on November 30, 2017, that sent Sami Vatanen and a conditional third-round pick in 2019 or 2020 to New Jersey in exchange for Adam Henrique, Joseph Blandisi and this pick.

References

Anaheim Ducks seasons
Anaheim Ducks
Ducks
Ducks